Pseudopostega beckeri is a moth of the family Opostegidae. It was described by Donald R. Davis and Jonas R. Stonis, 2007. It is known from the states of Goias, Minas Gerais and Parana in south-central Brazil.

The length of the forewings is 3.7–4.4 mm. Adults have been recorded in November.

Etymology
It is named in honor of Dr. Vitor O. Becker.

References

Opostegidae
Moths described in 2007